Stillwell Avenue is a major two-way north/south thoroughfare in southern Brooklyn and the central section of Coney Island. The road goes north, leaving Coney Island, ending at Bay Parkway, where the road continues as the Bay Ridge Parkway (former Route 439). On December 11, 2008 it acquired the subsidiary name Polar Bear Club Walk, named for the Coney Island Polar Bear Club. The Stillwell Avenue/Surf Avenue intersection on Coney Island is the location of the Coney Island–Stillwell Avenue subway station, a major subway station in New York City.

History
Stillwell Avenue was named after settler Nicholas Stillwell (1603–1671), who had a farm in the area and became the progenitor of an influential Brooklyn family by the same name.

Plans for Stillwell Avenue began in October 1926. The street was to stretch from Bay Parkway (its current northern terminus) and Neptune Avenue on Coney Island ( from the southern terminus). The project was to cost $331,500 and was certified by Brooklyn borough president James J. Byrne. Stillwell Avenue, at the intersection with Surf Avenue, is the location of the original Nathan's.

The New York Sun newspaper released a story in 2006 about plans to reinvigorate Coney Island. Most of it was for amusement parks, as well as a large waterpark and a three-story carousel. A scaled down version of this plan would later become Luna Park. In 2016, plans were released for the redevelopment of the Shore Theater at the intersection with Surf Avenue.

In 2016, the corner of Surf Avenue and Stillwell Avenue was co-named Nathan & Ida Handwerker Way – to honor Nathan and his wife Ida the co-founders of Nathan's Famous.

Street description 

Stillwell Avenue begins at the Atlantic Ocean on Coney Island, just north of the Riegelmann Boardwalk, occupying the position of West 14th Street. The road parallels Henderson Walk for a short distance to the intersection with Surf Avenue at 0.2  mile. Surf Avenue stretches parallel to the boardwalk on Coney Island. Neptune Avenue is the next intersection, intersecting at 0.4 mile. Soon afterwards, Stillwell Avenue crosses Coney Island Creek, which reaches into Lower New York Bay. Just after crossing the creek, Stillwell Avenue goes under the Shore Parkway, a section of the Belt Parkway system. Although it does not have an interchange with the road, Exit 6N on the westbound Shore Parkway is for Stillwell Avenue. Instead, the exit lets off at Avenue Z and accesses Stillwell within a mile. Bay 50th Street intersects just afterwards . At , there is an intersection with Kings Highway, which ends soon afterwards at Bay Parkway. Stillwell Avenue also comes to an end at Bay Parkway,  from its start. The road virtually continues as Bay Ridge Parkway, a street that was formerly part of Route 439.

Major intersections

Transportation 

At the Surf Avenue intersection on Coney Island, the largest elevated rapid transit terminal in existence, which shares a name with the avenue, is located on Stillwell Avenue. The station is also the most energy-efficient transit facility in the world. The other station located along Stillwell Avenue is the Bay 50th Street station in southern Brooklyn.

The  New York City Bus-operated bus lines serve the avenue.

See also 
Streets in Brooklyn
Transportation to Coney Island

References 

Streets in Brooklyn
1926 establishments in New York City